Dovhyi may refer to:

People
Oleksiy Dovhyi (born 1989), Ukrainian football midfielder

Places
Dovhyi Island, sandy island in Ochakiv Raion, Mykolaiv Oblast in Ukraine
Dovhyi Voinyliv, village in Kaluskyi Raion, Ivano-Frankivsk Oblast, Ukraine